Le Saint mène la danse (The Saint leads the Dance) also known as The Dance of Death and Le Saint conduit le bal (The Saint leads the Ball) is a 1960 film featuring Félix Marten as Simon Templar, the crimefighter also known as The Saint.

Plot
The Saint is in New York and helps in the arrest of a gangster, but a year later in Paris the gangster's friends try to get revenge.

Cast
 Felix Marten as Simon Templar
 Michèle Mercier as Dany
 Françoise Brion as Norma
 Jean Desailly as Freddie Pellman
 Nicole Mirel as Gina
 Henri Nassiet as Louis
 Clément Harari as Archie
 Jean-Marie Rivière as Mario

Production
This is a crime comedy directed by Jacques Nahum.

References

External links

1960 films
1960s French-language films
Films with screenplays by Albert Simonin
1960s French films